Rafael Parra Toro (Caracas, October 17, 1977), also known as Parratoro, is a visual artist born in Venezuela. Specializing in kinetic art and augmented reality using the artistic technique known as moiré, he has participated in group and solo exhibitions in Argentina, Chile, Germany, Mexico, Italy and the United States.

Biography

Early years 
Rafael Parra Toro was born on 1977 in Caracas, Venezuela. He studied engineering at the Central University of Venezuela, whose campus was declared a UNESCO World Heritage Site and Open Air Museum. There he became interested in the visual arts, inspired by the work of Venezuelan artists such as Jesús Rafael Soto, Gego, Víctor Valera, Carlos Cruz-Diez, Gerd Leufert and Carlos Raúl Villanueva; and international artists such as Alexander Calder, Víctor Vasarely, Jean Arp, Sophie Taeuber-Arp and Joan Miró.

Career 
Initially he worked as a 3D art developer for the video game industry with the company MP Game Studio, with which he made creations for companies such as Nickelodeon, DreamWorks and Cartoon Network. In 2013 he was part of the Pictoplasma Academy, a training program in visual arts and character creation developed by the German organization of the same name. He later co-founded a collective named The Eggplant, along with other visual artists.

Based in Buenos Aires, Argentina, since 2008, in the 2010s his work began to appear in several exhibitions around the world. In 2014 he was part of the group exhibition Pictoplasma at the Urban Spree gallery in Berlin, Germany and at the Museum of Contemporary Art in Monterrey, Mexico. Between 2014 and 2016 he participated in several exhibitions of the Curator's Voice Project in Miami, Florida, and in 2015 he presented a solo exhibition entitled "Moiréph" in Buenos Aires in honor of the writer Jorge Luis Borges. A year later he presented "La Evolución de la Forma" at the Borges Cultural Center and participated in the group exhibition "Ni una menos", both in Buenos Aires.

After participating in the Planck Festival of Digital Art in Buenos Aires, in 2017 he presented the solo exhibition "1 es a 1" at the Espacio O Gallery and at the Biblioteca Viva in Santiago de Chile, and made the mapping intervention of the Obelisk of Buenos Aires in commemoration of the thirty years of the Garrahan Hospital. In 2018 he participated in the group exhibition "La Ruta del Color" at Aura Galerías in Mexico City and presented a new solo show in Buenos Aires, entitled "Arte en Movimiento". After participating in Miami with the group collection "Filled Parcels", in 2020 he was part of the "Digital Diderot Exhibition", a virtual space of augmented reality simulation developed in the Argentine capital.

Through the crowdfunding platform Kickstarter, Parratoro published the real-time animation book Pop on Pop, in which he presents 110 designs of his authorship. His work was included in Outside the Lines Too, a book published by Penguin Group in which artists such as Ryan Humphrey, Rainer Judd, Richard Colman and Jim Houser also participate. He also designed the game Frenetic Kinetic for the mobile platforms IOS and Android.

Style 
Rafael Parra Toro's work is characterized by the development of kinetic and optical art in both physical and digital versions. He is a pioneer of artistic creation through the use of augmented reality and creates his works using the moiré technique, which is based on the superimposition of lines of division, in addition to relying on computer and mathematical tools applied to digital art. Parratoro is recognized as "one of the leading exponents of optical and kinetic art today".

Exhibitions

Group 

 2014 - "Pictoplasma", Urban Spree, Berlin, Germany
 2014 - "Pictoplasma", Museo de Arte Contemporáneo de Monterrey, Mexico
 2014 - "Fonzo", Curator's Voice Project, Miami, United States
 2014 - "Concepts", Curator's Voice Project, Miami, United States
 2014 - "Beautified Objects", Curator's Voice Project, Miami, United States
 2014 - "Miami-Miami", Curator's Voice Project, Miami, United States
 2014 - "Things of Beauty", Curator's Voice Project, Miami, United States
 2014 - "(Re) Vision", 1199 First Avenue, New York, United States
 2015 - "The Softline", Curator's Voice Project, Miami, United States
 2015 - "Memory", Schwerdter Strasse, Berlin, Germany
 2015 - "Premium", Curator's Voice Project, Miami, United States
 2016 - "Upfront", Curator's Voice Project, Miami, United States
 2016 - "Il Primato dello Sguardo", Messina, Italy
 2016 - "Ni una Menos", Buenos Aires, Argentina
 2016 - "Nei Luoghi Della Bellezza", Santa Caterina, Italy
 2016 - "Planck Festival of Digital Art", Buenos Aires, Argentina
 2018 - "La Ruta del Color", Aura Galerías, Mexico City
 2020 - "Diderot Digital Exhibition", Buenos Aires, Argentina

Source:

Individual 

 2015 - "Moiréph", Borges Cultural Center, Buenos Aires, Argentina
 2015 - "The Evolution of Form", Borges Cultural Center, Buenos Aires, Argentina
 2016 - "Arcobaleno", Buenos Aires, Argentina
 2017 - "1 is to 1", Espacio O and Biblioteca Viva, Santiago de Chile
 2017 - "Mapping of the Obelisk of Buenos Aires", Argentina
 2018 - "Art in Motion", Adriana Budich Gallery, Buenos Aires, Argentina

Source:

References

External links 
 
 
 

1977 births
Venezuelan artists
21st-century Argentine artists
Living people